Tolidopalpus castaneicolor is a beetle in the genus Tolidopalpus of the family Mordellidae. It was described in 1952 by Ermisch.

References

Mordellidae
Beetles described in 1952